The 2014 Premiership Rugby Sevens Series was the fifth Rugby Union 7-a-side competition for the twelve 2014–15 Aviva Premiership Clubs, and the first to include the four Welsh Regions that compete in the Pro12.

The pool stage of the tournament will start on 26 July 2014, before continuing on 31 July - 2 August 2014. The final took place on 8 August 2014.

Inclusion of Wales
On 20 May 2014, it was announced that this season, the 4 Welsh regions - Cardiff Blues, Newport Gwent Dragons, Ospreys and Scarlets - would join the series. They would play in their own pool, hosted at the BT Sport Cardiff Arms Park, and the top two regions would progress to contest the Series Final.

Format
The sixteen teams were split into four groups - A, B, C & D, based on geographical location. Each team in the group played each other once, to the International Rugby Board Laws of the Game - 7s Variations. Based on the result, teams received:
4 points for a win
2 points for a draw
1 bonus point for a loss by seven points or less
1 bonus point for scoring four or more tries in a match
Following all each group, the winner and runner up in each group progressed to the Final Stage.  In the final, the 8 teams (4 Winners and 4 Runners up) were arranged into 4 quarter-final pairings. The winners of each match qualified for the Cup semi-finals, with the losers moving into a new Plate competition. Thereafter, competition was a simple knockout bracket, with the winner of the Cup final being declared the series winner.

Group stage

Group A
Played at BT Sport Cardiff Arms Park, Cardiff on Saturday 26 July 2014. The pool will feature the Welsh Regions.

Group B
Played at Kingsholm, Gloucester on Thursday 31 July 2014.

Group C
Played at Franklin's Gardens, Northampton on Friday 1 August 2014.

Group D
Group D was scheduled to be played at Kingston Park, Newcastle on Saturday 2 August 2014. However, following the decision by Newcastle Falcons to install a 3G pitch in preparation for the new season, it was announced that the round would be moved to The Darlington Arena

Final stage
The final stage will be played at the Twickenham Stoop on Friday 8 August 2014. In a change to the previous competitions, in which teams competed in two pools and the best team in each pool and contested the final, the finals more closely resembled a sevens series finals day.

The four pool winners contested a quarter-final against a runner up from another pool. The winner of these quarter finals would compete in the cup competition, while the losers would compete in the plate competition.

Quarter-finals

Plate Competition

Plate Semi-finals

Plate Final

Cup Competition

Cup Semi-finals

Cup Final

Gloucester 7s win the 2014 Premiership Rugby Sevens Series

As with last year, the winner of the final qualifies for the World Club 7s. However, Gloucester have already qualified for the 2014 World Club 7s. As there can only one Welsh side in the tournament (the invited Cardiff Blues), Harlequins took the final place at the World Club 7s.

References

2014–15
Sevens
2014–15 in Welsh rugby union
2014 rugby sevens competitions